Pritong saging (lit. "fried banana"), also known as pritong saba, is a Filipino snack made from ripe saba or cardaba bananas sliced lengthwise and fried in oil. The bananas used are ideally very ripe, in which case it naturally caramelizes and no sugar is added. When younger starchier bananas are used, it is often eaten dipped in muscovado sugar, syrup, or coconut caramel (latik). Unlike the similar pisang goreng of neighboring countries, it is not as popular as street food. Instead it is regarded as a simple home-made snack, most commonly eaten for merienda.

See also

 Maruya (food)
 Banana cue
 Pisang goreng
 Chuối chiên
 Fried plantain
 List of banana dishes

References

External links

Desserts
Banana dishes
Vegetarian dishes of the Philippines
Deep fried foods